God, Sex and Truth is a 2018 Indian pornographic short monologue documentary directed by Ram Gopal Varma. starring American pornographic actress Mia Malkova. The film is a short documentary about strength of female sexuality and beauty. The film music is scored by M. M. Keeravani. The film is produced by Strike Force LLC, USA. It was released on January 27, 2018, on Vimeo OnDemand.

Plot
In the film, Mia Malkova delivers a monologue about her sexuality, the role of women in society and the matriarchal and ultrafeminist bonds that attempt to tie them.

Cast
 Mia as herself

Controversy
The film was mired in controversy as a result of a creative dispute between the director and one of the scriptwriters, Jaya Kumar. This dispute eventually blossomed into lurid allegations of plagiarism, sexual harassment in the workplace, and improper compensation. This dispute resulted in a lawsuit filed against the director by Kumar in a civil court in India.

The case filed against Ram Gopal Varma for obscenity on a complaint by a social activist in Hyderabad. Complaint registered against him for publishing or transmitting obscene material in electronic form.

Sequel
After positive reviews and critics, Ram Gopal Varma announced the sequel "GST2".

References

External links
 

2018 films
Indian documentary films
Documentary films about pornography
Films directed by Ram Gopal Varma
2010s English-language films